Owen Matthews (born December 1971) is a British writer, historian and journalist. His first book, Stalin's Children, was shortlisted for the 2008 Guardian First Book Award, the Orwell Prize for political writing, and France's Prix Médicis Etranger. His books have been translated into 28 languages. He is a former Moscow and Istanbul Bureau Chief for Newsweek.

Biography 
Owen Matthews was born in London in 1971. He is half-Russian and he speaks the language as a native speaker. He was educated at Westminster School and studied Modern History at Christ Church, Oxford.

Journalism 

During the Bosnian War, Matthews worked as a foreign correspondent in Budapest, Sarajevo and Belgrade. From 1995–7 he worked as a reporter on The Moscow Times. In 1997 he joined Newsweek Magazine's Moscow Bureau as a correspondent, covering the Second Chechen War. In 2001 he moved to Turkey, reporting from Turkey, the Caucasus, Syria and Iran, and also covering the invasions of Afghanistan and then Iraq. From 2006 to 2012 he was Newsweek's Moscow Bureau Chief; he is now a Contributing Editor at the magazine. In 2014 he reported for Newsweek on the conflict in Eastern Ukraine.

Books 
Stalin's Children: Three Generations of Love and War (Bloomsbury, 2008), a memoir of three generations of Matthews' family in Russia, was named as a Book of the Year by The Sunday Times and Sunday Telegraph.
Glorious Misadventures: Nikolai Rezanov and the Dream of Russian America (Bloomsbury 2013), a history of Imperial Russia's doomed attempt to colonise America, was shortlisted for the 2014 Pushkin House Prize for books on Russia.
Moscou Babylone (Les Escales, 2013), a novel based on Matthews' experiences in Moscow in the 1990s, has been published in French, German and Czech. It was chosen as the 'coup de coeur etranger' (favourite foreign book) at the 2013 Nancy Literary Festival, Le Livre sur la Place.
Thinking with the Blood, (Newsweek, 2014), a personal reportage based on a journey across war-torn Ukraine in the late summer of 2014, was published as an ebook.
L'Ombre du Sabre (Les Escales, 2016) A novel inspired by the author's own experiences as a reporter in Chechnya in the 1990s and in Eastern Ukraine in 2014 
An Impeccable Spy: Richard Sorge, Stalin's Master Agent (Bloomsbury, 2019) A biography of German Communist spy Richard Sorge, the first English language work written with extensive access to the Soviet archives. Chosen as a Book of the Year by The Economist magazine: "A tragic, heroic story, magnificently told with an understated rage."
Black Sun (Doubleday, 2019), Based on real events—the bid by Andrei Sakharov to develop a bomb to end all bombs, this story is set in a secret Soviet city in 1961. Featuring murder and betrayals, and a flawed but principled KGB man as its hero, it unfolds in the aftermath of Stalinism, amid the scars left by the purges, denunciations and Great Patriotic War. Chosen as a Book of the Year by The Economist  (making Matthews the first ever author to have two books on the Economist list in the same year); a Crime Book of the Month in The Sunday Times; and one of the Financial Times''' Best Thrillers of 2019. Red Traitor (Doubleday, 2021), Set during the height of the Cuban Missile Crisis, seen from a bone-chilling vantage point: somewhere off the Florida coastline, trapped aboard the claustrophobic confines of an isolated Soviet submarine with open orders to fire its nuclear payload.

Art

In 2013 Matthews had his first solo art show, "Impact" at the Galerie Nivet Carzon in Paris. The installation centred on an impacted 9mm pistol round which Matthews picked up from a pavement in Baghdad, Iraq, next to the body of a man whom it had killed.

Television
Matthews co-wrote the 2015 Russian television series Londongrad'' and played an episodic role in it. Matthews also played the US Ambassador to Moscow in the 2017 Russian television series The Optimists.

In 2016-18 Matthews appeared regularly as a guest on Russian political talk shows 60 Minut (Russia's top-rated talk show on Russia-1); NTV's Mesto Vstrechi and Russia-1's Evening with Vladimir Solovyov. He was known for outspoken criticism of the Kremlin and his clashes with senior Russian politicians, including Vladimir Zhirinovsky.

References

External links 
 Newsweek Magazine author page
 Spectator Magazine author page
 Pushkin House Prize author interview
 Guardian First Books Award author interview
 Nancy Literary Festival author interview
 Huffington Post author interview
 Profile on TNT

British writers
British journalists
British historians
1971 births
Living people
Alumni of Christ Church, Oxford